Johann Georg Palitzsch (1723–1788) was a German astronomer.

Palitzsch may also refer to:
 Gerhard Palitzsch (1913–1944), German SS non-commissioned officer in Auschwitz concentration camp
 Palitzsch (crater) and Vallis Palitzsch, moon features
 11970 Palitzsch, an asteroid 
 Peter Palitzsch (1918–2004), a German theatre director associated with Bertold Brecht 

German-language surnames